The Roman Catholic Diocese of Padang is a diocese located in the city of Padang in the Ecclesiastical province of Medan in Indonesia.

History
 June 19, 1952: Established as the Apostolic Prefecture of Padang from the Apostolic Vicariate of Palembang
 January 3, 1961: Promoted as Diocese of Padang

Leadership
 Bishops of Padang (Roman rite)
 Bishop Vitus Rubianto Solichin, S.X. (July 3, 2021 – present)
 Bishop Martinus Dogma Situmorang, O.F.M. Cap. (March 17, 1983 – November 19, 2019)
 Bishop Raimondo Cesare Bergamin, S.X. (October 16, 1961 – March 17, 1983)
 Prefects Apostolic of Padang (Roman Rite)
 Fr. Pascal de Martino, S.X. (June 27, 1952 – 1961)

References
 GCatholic.org
 Catholic Hierarchy

Roman Catholic dioceses in Indonesia
Christian organizations established in 1952
Roman Catholic dioceses and prelatures established in the 20th century
1952 establishments in Indonesia